Robert Alan Lewis (February 9, 1925 – April 28, 2020) was an American rock and roll and rhythm and blues singer, best known for his 1961 hit singles "Tossin' and Turnin'" and "One Track Mind".

Biography
Lewis was born in Indianapolis, Indiana and was raised in an orphanage.<ref name="billb">{{cite magazine |last1=Unterberger|first1=Andrew|title=Bobby Lewis, '60s Singer and 'Tossin' & Turnin Hitmaker, Dies at 95 |url=https://www.billboard.com/articles/columns/rock/9401723/bobby-lewis-dead-tossin-turnin |magazine=Billboard |access-date=July 22, 2020 |date=June 13, 2020}}</ref> He learned to play the piano by age six, despite very poor eyesight. Adopted at age twelve, he moved to a foster home in Detroit, Michigan, but ran away at the age of 14.  Growing up with the influences of the pioneer blues musicians until the advent of rock and roll, Lewis began to build a musical career in the 1950s, initially working in carnival shows, and then as a singer with the Leo Hines Orchestra in Indianapolis.  He made his first recordings for the Spotlight label, and then recorded "Mumbles Blues" for Chess Records in 1952.  At one stage he was managed by Nat Tarnopol, who also managed Jackie Wilson.

Lewis moved to New York City, and his 1960 recording of "Tossin' and Turnin'" on the Beltone label went to No.1 for seven weeks on the Billboard'' chart in summer 1961. It sold over one million copies and was awarded a gold disc.  Later in 1961, Lewis had a second Top Ten song, "One Track Mind", his only other major hit record (again on Beltone), charting at No. 9.   Subsequent records were less successful.  Beltone Records itself went out of business in 1963, and later recordings for ABC-Paramount and other labels were also commercial failures.

In a 2011 interview, Lewis said that he had lived in Newark, New Jersey since about 1980, and had become almost blind, but still performed occasionally.

Lewis died on April 28, 2020, aged 95, after contracting pneumonia.

References

External links
 Oldies
 

1925 births
2020 deaths
20th-century American pianists
21st-century American pianists
American male pianists
American pop pianists
American rhythm and blues singers
American rock pianists
American rock singers
Musicians from Indianapolis
Singers from Detroit
African-American pianists
20th-century African-American male singers